Psycho Sam may refer to:

Mark Vartanian, Sammy Couch, also known as 'Psycho' Sam Cody
Richard McCroskey, also known as Syko Sam, convicted of the 2009 Farmville murders